Li Ji (July 12, 1896 – August 1, 1979), also commonly romanized as Li Chi, was an influential Chinese archaeologist. He is considered to be one of the foremost figures in modern Chinese archaeology and his work was instrumental in proving the historical authenticity of the Shang Dynasty.

Biography
Li Ji came from a wealthy family of Hubei province, where, in 1896, he was born in the city of Zhongxiang. After his graduation from the Tsinghua University in Beijing he moved to the United States in 1918 to study psychology at Clark University in Worcester, Massachusetts. After he had earned a BA in psychology and a MA in sociology at Clark, he moved on to Harvard University to study anthropology. There he studied in particular with Alfred Tozzer (archeology), Roland Burrage Dixon (anthropology) and Earnest Hooton (anthropology) and was awarded a PhD in 1923. His dissertation was later published by Harvard University Press under the title The Formation of the Chinese People: an Anthropological Inquiry (1928). Li Ji returned to China and began teaching anthropology and sociology at Nankai University and later at Tsinghua University. In 1925 and 1926 he conducted archeological excavations of the Yangshao culture in the southern part of the Shanxi province, for which he was invited to join the Freer Gallery of Art in Washington D.C. as a field worker. In 1928 he became the first director of the archeology department of the Academica Sinica while continuing to work for the Freer Gallery.

Li Ji led the excavations at Yinxu near Anyang  from 1928 to 1937 until the outbreak of the Second Sino-Japanese War prevented further work. Regarded as the first set of archaeological excavations following modern archaeological principles in China, these excavations yielded the discovery of a royal palace and over 300 graves, including 4 royal ones. The recovered artefacts comprised among others early bronze casts and a large number of oracle bones, which represent the earliest significant body of ancient Chinese writing. Those findings finally established historical authenticity of the Shang Dynasty, which had still been a subject of debate up to that point.

After the war Li Ji fled to Taiwan when the communist forces under Mao Zedong took power in mainland China.  There he became the head of the archeology and anthropology departments of the National Taiwan University in Taipei. He died on August 1 of 1979 in Taipei.

During his career Li mentored a generation of Chinese archaeologists including Xia Nai, Kwang-chih Chang, and Guo Baojun.

Influence

Chinese Modern Archaeology
In 1929, the excavation of Yinxu personally presided over by Li Ji did not focus on finding oracle bones, but pottery, animal bones, and bronzes were given equal attention as specimens. When working in the field, use the digging method to excavate. During the excavation in the second half of 1929, Li Ji also asked Zhang Weiran to measure a more detailed topographic map of the Yinxu. All of this shows that the excavators attached great importance to the spatial location of the unearthed objects. However, in the excavation of strata, Li Ji followed his horizontal stratum excavation method in Xiyin Village, Xia County. It marked that the excavation of Yinxu in 1929 completely broke away from the category of epigraphy and began to truly move towards the road of modern field archaeology.

And this layering method promoted the excavation of Yinxu. In 1931, the excavation of the Hougang of Yinxu revealed that the three cultural layers of Xiaotun, Longshan and Yangshao were superimposed and accumulated, and confirmed the sequence of ancient Chinese cultural evolution.

Yinxu and the origin of Chinese culture

The exploration of the cultural origin of Yinxu and the reconstruction of ancient history, the former is an archaeological problem, and the latter is a historical problem, but the two are interrelated. The exploration of the cultural origin of Yinxu is the basis for the reconstruction of ancient history. At the beginning of the excavation of Yinxu, the excavators paid attention to the origin of Yinxu culture. During the third excavation of Yinxu in 1929, Li Ji discussed the pioneers of the "Xiaotun Culture" based on a piece of painted pottery unearthed in the strata.

Li Ji's Views on Archaeology

Although Li Ji presided over the excavation of Yinxu in order to find the origin of Chinese civilization and refuted Andersson's statement about Chinese culture, he was always vigilant that he could not fall into the myth of nationalism. He criticized the "cultural centralism" prejudice of Western sinologists, and needed to pay attention to the uniqueness of Eastern civilization. On the other hand, he also criticized the limitations of Chinese scholars and paid too much attention to cultural exchanges in East Asia and surrounding areas.

Works
1928: The Formation of the Chinese People: an Anthropological Inquiry
1932: Manchuria in History: a summary
1957: The Beginnings of Chinese Civilization 
1977: Anyang

Notes

Further reading
Clayton D. Brown: Li Ji: Father of Chinese Archaeology. In: Orientations Vol. 39, No. 3, April 2008, p. 61-66.
Henrika Kuklik: A new History of Anthropology. Wiley 2008, p. 214-215

External links 

Li Chi at Britannica Online

1896 births
1979 deaths
20th-century archaeologists
Clark University alumni
Chinese archaeologists
Members of Academia Sinica
Educators from Hubei
People from Jingmen
Academic staff of the National Taiwan University
Republic of China writers
Writers from Hubei
Scientists from Hubei
Harvard Graduate School of Arts and Sciences alumni
Academic staff of Nankai University
Academic staff of Tsinghua University
Chinese epigraphers
Yangshao culture